The Chinese Elm cultivar Ulmus parvifolia 'Golden Rey' is an American clone patented by B. Rey in 1990.

Description
Chiefly distinguished by its spreading dome shape, the leaves emerge a uniform light yellow, maturing to chartreuse. The exfoliating bark is a mottled mix of grey, orange and brown.

Pests and diseases
The species and its cultivars are highly resistant, but not immune, to Dutch elm disease, and unaffected by the Elm Leaf Beetle Xanthogaleruca luteola.

Cultivation
'Golden Rey' is not known to be in cultivation beyond the United States.

Synonymy
'Golden Ray': in error.
'Aurea'

Accessions
None known.

Nurseries

North America

ForestFarm Nursery, Williams, Oregon, US.
Green Creek Nursery, Stephenville, Texas, US.
Rosebrook Nursery, Oklahoma City, Oklahoma, US.

References

Chinese elm cultivar
Ulmus articles missing images
Ulmus